The athletics competition at the 2010 Central American and Caribbean Games was held at the Mayagüez Athletics Stadium in Mayagüez, Puerto Rico from July 24–30. A total of 47 events were contested, 24 by men and 23 by women, and 12 Games records were set. Also, 3 national records were set (2 by the men and 1 by the women). Of the twenty-three nations that won a medal in the competition, Jamaica was the most successful, topping the table with ten golds and an overall haul of 25 medals. Mexico and Colombia were the next best performers, with seven and six golds, respectively. The hosts were fourth in the rankings with four golds and sixteen medals in all.

Cuba – typically one of the strongest teams in the region – was absent from the contest, but the quality of the performances on show remained high regardless. Among the stand-out competitors of the competition, Churandy Martina played a part in all his country's medals, winning their two golds with a 100 metres/200 metres double and anchoring the men's 4 x 100 metres relay team to the bronze medal. Beverly Ramos excelled on home turf: she won the 5000 metres and 3000 metres steeplechase races with Games record times and also took the bronze in the 1500 metres. Juan Luis Barrios of Mexico completed a 1500/5000 m double while his compatriot Juan Carlos Romero won 5000 silver and the 10,000 metres gold. Rosibel García of Colombia retained her 1500 m title from 2006, but also added the 800 m gold to her tally. Venezuelan athlete Eduard Villanueva came close to the same feat in the men's events, but was runner-up over the longer distance.

Medal summary

Men's track events

Men's road events

Men's field events

Women's track events

Women's road events

Women's field events

Medal table

Participating nations
Thirty of the 31 countries competing at the games were represented in the athletics competition, with 23 of these reaching the medal table. Aruba was the only nation without a representative in the events.

 (7)
 (16)
 (7)
 (5)
 (6)
 (8)
 (9)
 (32)
 (14)
 (3)
 (31)
 (7)
 (6)
 (15)
 (7)
 (10)
 (5)
 (45)
 (47)
 (5)
 (4)
 (7)
 (60)
 (9)
 (3)
 (4)
 (1)
 (28)
 (9)
 (21)

References
 Results
  . Mayaguez 2010. Retrieved on 2010-07-29.
 
 Reports
 Robinson, Javier Clavelo (2010-07-26). Martina defends 100m title, Brathwaite dominates the sprint hurdles in Mayaguez - CAC Games, days 1 and 2. IAAF. Retrieved on 2010-07-29.
 Robinson, Javier Clavelo (2010-07-28). Martina completes dash double as Brenes runs 44.84 at the CAC Games. IAAF. Retrieved on 2010-07-29.
 Robinson, Javier Clavelo (2010-07-30). Trinidad and Tobago clock 38.24 to take 4x100m relay gold in Mayaguez - CAC Games, day 5. IAAF. Retrieved on 2010-07-31.
 Robinson, Javier Clavelo (2010-07-31). Jamaica dominates relays, Barrios and Ramos complete doubles as CAC Games conclude in Mayaguez. IAAF. Retrieved on 2010-07-31.

External links

Events at the 2010 Central American and Caribbean Games
CAC Games
Athletics at the Central American and Caribbean Games
International athletics competitions hosted by Puerto Rico
Athl
Athl
Athl